Inevitability thesis is term that has been applied to a number of theories, including:

 Daniel Chandler's thesis that once technology is introduced, it is inevitably developed
 Steven Goldberg's thesis that inevitable male dominance is rooted in physiological differences between men and women
 F. Hayek's thesis in The Road to Serfdom that any amount of central control inevitably leads to totalitarianism
 S. Huntington's thesis in The Clash of Civilizations that modernization of the third world inevitably begets violence
 Immanuel Kant's position that people inevitably make fallacious inferences from the dialectical syllogisms